The National Union Front was an Iraqi nationalist political alliance formed in 1954 and re-established in 1956 as a coalition of the Ba'ath Party, the Iraqi Communist Party, the Iraqi Independence Party, the National Democratic Party and later the Kurdistan Democratic Party. The alliance supported various Arab nationalist and liberation movements around the world, supporting the governments in Egypt and Syria and supporting the Algerian liberation movement. The party splintered and dissolved in the aftermath of the 1958 revolution led by Abd al-Karim Qasim after division across between Arab nationalists and Iraqi communists.

References

1956 establishments in Iraq
1958 disestablishments in Iraq
Arab nationalism in Iraq
Arab nationalist political parties
Defunct political party alliances in Iraq
History of the Ba'ath Party
Iraqi Communist Party
Iraqi nationalism
Nationalist parties in Iraq
Organizations associated with the Ba'ath Party
Political parties disestablished in 1958
Political parties established in 1956
Popular fronts